Pakuan City Football Club (simply known as Pakuan City or PCFC) is an Indonesian football club based in Bogor, West Java. They currently compete in the Liga 3.

History
Founded in 2021, Pakuan City made club debut into Indonesia football by joining the third-tier league Indonesia Liga 3 in 2021. They have acquired Cirebon FC which previously competed in Liga 3, they also moved their homebase from Cirebon to Bogor.

The CEO of Pakuan City, Dodi Irwan Suparno, seems very serious about rebuilding football in Bogor. With a background as a veterinarian entrepreneur who owns a number of pet shop outlets in West Java, he immediately took care of Pakuan City FC as CEO. He is known as a football fan and has a great desire to develop soccer at an early age.

Pakuan City FC's gait began by participating in the 2021 Bogor Mayor's Cup tournament. They succeeded in becoming champions after defeating Ebod Jaya in the final match, they even got rid of big-name clubs from Bandung Regency in the semifinals.

Honours
 Bogor Mayor's Cup
 Champion: 2021

Sponsorship
The complete sponsors are as follow

Sponsors
 Zenith Apparel
 Satwagia
 Bogor Raya TV
 PT. Zalila Hasiba Arshiya
 PT. Pakuan Andalan Siliwangi
 Moyya Water
 Milky Var
 Karya Anilo
 The Yonan Hotel
 Warunk Boss Bray
 Zayyan Water
 90 Stats
 Enzo Water

References

External links

Bogor
Sport in West Java
Football clubs in Indonesia
Football clubs in West Java
Association football clubs established in 2021
2021 establishments in Indonesia